Timbrelham is a hamlet in the parish of Lezant, Cornwall, England, United Kingdom. It is in the Tamar valley next to Greystone Bridge.

References

Hamlets in Cornwall